Coorg Green Cardamom is a green variety of Cardamom grown in Coorg, Karnataka.

Geographical indication rights
Coorg Green Cardamom received  Intellectual Property Rights Protection or Geographical Indication (GI) status.

See also
Coorg orange
Nanjanagud Banana
Udupi Mattu Gulla
Byadagi chilli
Bangalore Blue

References

Indian spices
Kodagu district
Flora of Karnataka
Geographical indications in Karnataka